Michael Bro Johansen (born July 22, 1972) is a Danish former professional football player who played as a midfielder in the Danish Superliga for FC Copenhagen and for English club Bolton Wanderers. He played two games for the Danish national team in 2000 and 2002, and was an unused substitute at the 1992 Summer Olympics. He is the older twin brother of former footballer Martin Johansen, and played alongside him in several clubs.

Biography
Born in Glostrup, both Michael and Martin Johansen started playing for local Copenhagen club Rosenhøj IF at the age of four. They both went on to play for Kjøbenhavns Boldklub where they made their senior debut in the second-best Danish division in 1990. They moved to Danish Superliga club B 1903 in 1991 before they signed for FC Copenhagen upon the founding of that club in 1992. They helped the club win the Danish Superliga title in its first year of existence, and in 1996 the twins parted ways as Michael Johansen moved to the English First Division to join Bolton Wanderers. Signed for £1.250.000, he became a star at Bolton, earning the nickname "Smurf", and helped the club earn promotion to the Premier League for the 1997–98 season. Bolton's stint in the Premiership only lasted a year, before the club was once again relegated to the First Division. He also helped Bolton to the FA Cup semi final in 2000, but he was one of two Bolton players to have their penalty saved by Aston Villa goalkeeper David James as they crashed out in a penalty shootout. In all, Johansen played 137 matches and scored 16 goals for Bolton.

In June 2000, he returned to Denmark to play for Superliga bronze winners AB Copenhagen. As Morten Olsen became Danish national team coach in 2000, he called Johansen up for his national team debut in August 2000, in a 2–0 win against the Faroe Islands. In November 2002, Johansen won his second and last cap for Denmark, in a 2–0 win against Poland. As AB was relegated following the Danish Superliga 2003-04 season, Michael moved to amateur club Greve IF where he was reunited with Martin Johansen. Michael Johansen is now a FIFA-licensed player agent.

Honours

Bolton Wanderers
 First Division: 1996–97

Footnotes

External links
 
 
 Danish national team profile

1972 births
Danish men's footballers
Danish expatriate men's footballers
Olympic footballers of Denmark
Footballers at the 1992 Summer Olympics
Kjøbenhavns Boldklub players
F.C. Copenhagen players
Bolton Wanderers F.C. players
Living people
Premier League players
Danish Superliga players
Expatriate footballers in England
Danish expatriate sportspeople in England
Denmark international footballers
Denmark under-21 international footballers
Danish twins
Twin sportspeople
Association football midfielders
People from Glostrup Municipality
Sportspeople from the Capital Region of Denmark